Kusehlar-e Olya (also Romanized as Kūsehlar-e ‘Olyā; also known as Kūsālār-e ‘Olyā) is a village in Zarrineh Rud Rural District, in the Central District of Miandoab County, West Azerbaijan Province, Iran. At the 2006 census, its population was 469, in 131 families.

References 

Populated places in Miandoab County